Iolaus pseudopollux is a butterfly in the family Lycaenidae. It is found in south-western Uganda.

The larvae feed on Agelanthus zizyphifolius.

References

Butterflies described in 1962
Iolaus (butterfly)
Endemic fauna of Uganda
Butterflies of Africa